Cedric Vernon "Ced" Kellway (2 July 189214 June 1963) was an Australian public servant and diplomat.

Career
Kellway joined the Commonwealth Public Service in 1908, in the Treasury.

In September 1945, Kellway was appointed Consul-General in New York. Four years later, in September 1949, Kellway was named as the first Minister to Italy. Kellway and his family left directly from New York for Rome in October 1949. While Kellway was Minister to Italy his daughter Anne met Lieutenant Jeffrey Francis and was married in Rome, in 1953.

Kellway was appointed Minister to Brazil in 1954. While posted in Brazil, Kellway's wife was flown to New York for successful surgery, on the advice of physicians.

Kellway retired to Bath, Somerset. He died on 14 June 1963.

References

1892 births
1963 deaths
Ambassadors of Australia to Brazil
Ambassadors of Australia to Italy
Consuls-General of Australia in New York